"Donda Chant" is the opening track of American rapper Kanye West's tenth studio album Donda (2021). The song features vocals from American singer-songwriter Syleena Johnson, who had recorded vocals for another song that was eventually scrapped from the album. A music video for the song was released via Instagram by West on September 18, 2021. Throughout the video, pictures of both Kanye and his mother Donda West are projected atop a replica of the former's childhood home.

Background and composition
West first collaborated with Syleena Johnson in 2004 on his single "All Falls Down", where she contributed vocals on the chorus, interpolating lyrics from Lauryn Hill's "Mystery of Iniquity". West continued to work with Johnson during the early years of his career, including producing her 2005 track "Bull's-Eye (Suddenly)". On July 15, 2021, Johnson flew out to San Francisco to record for Donda. Johnson talked more about the collaboration on Cocktails with Queens on Fox Soul on August 31, saying that West told her that he "wanted the album to have some type of healing component", after which Johnson suggested that the consonant sounds in "Donda" kinda sound like a "meditative chant". The singer then laid down vocals repeating "Donda" in different cadences and rhythms after telling West about the idea. She said that she had no idea that West would use the track in the way that he did on the album. Johnson said during the same session that she recorded vocals for another song, which was ultimately not included on the album. Musically, "Donda Chant" is a spoken word song. Johnson repeatedly chants "Donda" for the song's full length of 52 seconds without pausing as a mantra, replicating the sound of a fading heartbeat. She utters the word 60 times, accompanied by no instrumental.

Music video
On September 18, 2021, West shared an accompanying music video exclusively to his Instagram. The video was directed by British fashion photographer Nick Knight, who also shot the visual for the album track "24". It is set in black and white, and has a length of 61 seconds. Aerial footage is displayed of the replica of West's replica childhood home from the album's third listening party at Soldier Field in Chicago on August 26, 2021, which two rows of moving cars circle around. Flashes of photographs are projected onto the replica house that show Donda, who is pictured as both a child and an adult, while some images feature Kanye West accompanying her. Pictures of West as a baby and video footage of his mother, including clips where she laughs, are also displayed.

Reception

The New York Post ranked "Donda Chant" as one of the worst songs of 2021.

Personnel
Credits adapted from Tidal.
 Vocals - Syleena Johnson
 Mixing engineering - Irko
 Record engineering - Alejandro Rodriguez-Dawsøn, Will Chason

Charts

References

External links

2021 songs
Kanye West songs
Song recordings produced by Kanye West
Songs written by Kanye West
Spoken word
Syleena Johnson songs
A cappella songs
Chants